The Five Companions is a Big Finish Productions audiobook based on the long-running British science fiction television series Doctor Who.  It is free to subscribers and released with Army of Death.

Plot
Five of the Doctor's former companions find themselves suddenly scooped up out of their quiet lives and brought to a mysterious realm.  And joining them in their confused frustration are a herd of dinosaurs, some Sontaran soldiers and a squadron of Daleks.

Cast
Fifth Doctor – Peter Davison
Ian Chesterton – William Russell
Steven Taylor – Peter Purves
Sara Kingdom – Jean Marsh
Polly – Anneke Wills
Nyssa – Sarah Sutton
Daleks – Nicholas Briggs
Sontarans – Dan Starkey

Continuity
For the Doctor, this story takes place during the events of The Five Doctors, on his home world of Gallifrey.  In that twentieth anniversary television story, Borusa, President of the Time Lords, is seen scooping up various friends, enemies and incarnations of the Doctor and forcing them to battle each other in a forbidden region of their world known as The Death Zone.  The Fifth Doctor takes a transmat device from the Master, which transports him from the Death Zone to the Time Lord capitol.  This audio story takes place after he transmats, but before he arrives in the capitol.
For the all companions in this audio, the story takes place long after they stopped traveling with him.
Ian, a school teacher from the 1960s, was in the first Doctor Who story, An Unearthly Child.  He, and fellow teacher, Barbara Wright, were unwilling companions to the First Doctor and his granddaughter Susan.  The two finally got themselves back to the 1960s a couple years later, by means of a captured Dalek time machine (which subsequently self-destructed), in The Chase. Ian first encountered the Daleks on his first trip off Earth in, The Daleks. In that story, as in this, he crawls inside the casing of and pretends to be a Dalek.
The Chase also introduced Steven, a space pilot from the future.  He became the King of a new society on an alien world in The Savages.
Sara travelled with the Doctor and Steven during the twelve episode story The Daleks' Master Plan.  She was a security agent from the future.  At the end of Daleks' Master Plan, she aged to death.  In the audio dramas, Home Truths and The Guardian of the Solar System, she was, in a way, resurrected.
Just after The Savages, the Doctor met Polly in The War Machines.  She was a secretary from the 1960s who journeyed in the TARDIS, alongside her friend, sailor Ben Jackson.  She and Ben witnessed the Doctor's first regeneration in The Tenth Planet.  It is that adventure that the Fifth Doctor is referring to when he recalls Polly standing up to the Cybermen.  The Second Doctor returned Ben and Polly home (the same day they left) in The Faceless Ones.
Nyssa was an alien princess who met the Fourth Doctor in The Keeper of Traken, and witnessed his regeneration into the Fifth, in Logopolis.  She left him to work on a plague spaceship in Terminus.
Steven and Sara faced the Daleks together in The Daleks' Master Plan.
Polly helped the newly regenerated Doctor battle the Daleks in The Power of the Daleks.
Nyssa has only had Dalek stories in audios, such as The Mutant Phase and Plague of the Daleks.
Nyssa met the Sontarans in the audio Heroes of Sontar.
At this point in his life, the Doctor hasn't reunited with any of these companions, nor they with him.  However, he has already spent time traveling with an older Nyssa.  The CD cover art indicates that Nyssa is still relatively young, putting her placement after Terminus, but long before her reunion in Cobwebs.
Ian is also timescooped in The Time Museum.
This is the first story to feature the Daleks battling the Sontarans, although they were seen to be allied in "The Pandorica Opens".

Notes
Dan Starkey has played Sontarans in several recent Doctor Who television stories such as "The Sontaran Stratagem" and "A Good Man Goes to War".
It was intended that William Russell's character, Ian, was to meet the Fifth Doctor in the television story Mawdryn Undead.  He was unavailable at the time and instead, Nicholas Courtney appeared as The Brigadier. Oblique reference is made to this in this audio story.

References

2011 audio plays
Fifth Doctor audio plays
Dalek audio plays